Peter Williams (born 20 April 1948), CBE is the former Chief Executive of the Quality Assurance Agency for Higher Education (QAA), and the current Honorary President of the British Accreditation Council for Independent Further and Higher Education (BAC). He was given a CBE for his services to higher education in 2009.

Education 
Peter Williams has a degree in English from the University of Exeter.

Career 
 1969 Management Trainee, Hazell, Watson and Viney (printers)
 1970 Registry office, University of Surrey
 1974 Higher Degrees Office, University of Leicester
 1978 Assistant Registrar, Medical School, University of Leicester
 1982 Secretary, Medical School, University of Leicester
 1984 Deputy Secretary, British Academy
 1990 Director (first and only), Committee of Vice-Chancellors and Principals of the Universities of the United Kingdom (CVCP), Academic Audit Unit (AAU)
 1992 Director of the Quality Assurance Group of the Higher Education Quality Council (HEQC)
 1997 Director of Institutional Review in the Quality Assurance Agency for Higher Education (QAA), 
 2001 Acting Chief Executive, Quality Assurance Agency for Higher Education (QAA)
 2002-2009 Chief Executive of QAA
 2005-8 President, European Association for Quality Assurance in Higher Education ([ENQA])
 2009 Retired
2009-2016 Governor, Vice-chair and Chair of Audit Committee, Cardiff Metropolitan University
2011-2017 Member, Education Honours Committee
 2012-18 Chair, British Accreditation Council for Independent Further and Higher Education
2019 Honorary President, British Accreditation Council for Independent Further and Higher Education
 2012-19 Trustee, Richmond The American International University in London
 2014-15 Master, Worshipful Company of Educators
 2017 Chair, Norfolk Archives and Heritage Development Foundation (NORAH)
2018 Trustee, The Educators' Trust

References

External links 
 Quality Assurance Agency for Higher Education (QAA)

1948 births
Alumni of the University of Exeter
British educational theorists
Living people